Vazifeh Khvoran (also Romanized as Vaz̧īfeh Khvorān and Vaz̧īfeh Khowrān; also known as Vazīfeh Khorān) is a village in Qaranqu Rural District, in the Central District of Hashtrud County, East Azerbaijan Province, Iran. At the 2006 census, its population was 654, in 153 families.

References 

Towns and villages in Hashtrud County